This is a list of all lighthouses in the U.S. state of Ohio.

References

Ohio
 
Lighthouses
Lighthouses